Amisk Lake is a lake in the east-central part of the Canadian province of Saskatchewan, about  south-west of Flin Flon, Manitoba. 'Amisk' means beaver in Cree. Saskatchewan Highway 167 provides road access. Denare Beach, the largest settlement, is located at the north-east corner of the lake.

Forts 
Amisk Lake is along the course of the Sturgeon-Weir River, an important part of the canoe route from eastern Canada to the rich Lake Athabasca country. There was an independent trading post on Amisk Lake (Beaver Lake) in 1775 and a Hudson's Bay Company trading post in 1776.

Frobisher-Henry Fort 
In June 1775 Alexander Henry the elder left Montreal with 16 canoes and goods worth £3,000. On Lake Winnipeg he was joined by Peter Pond, Joseph Frobisher, and Thomas Frobisher. From the new Hudson's Bay Company post at Cumberland Lake Henry and the two Frobishers went north up the Sturgeon-Weir hoping to reach Frog Portage where Thomas had traded successfully the previous year. They crossed Amisk Lake on the first of November and the next morning it was frozen over. Since there was good fishing they stopped at the mouth of the West Weir and built a fort. On the first of January Henry set out on foot and spent three months visiting the Indians. Next spring they went north to Frog Portage and were successful in trade. Joseph Frobisher maintained the post of Amisk Lake until it was abandoned in 1778.

Amisk Lake Recreation Site 
Amisk Lake Recreation Site is a provincial recreation site on the eastern shore of Amisk Lake. The park is divided into two sections. The Sand Beach campground is located at the south-east corner of the lake and has a campground with 12 campsites and lake access. At the north-eastern corner of the lake, just north of Denare Beach, is Sawmill Bay Campground. Sawmill Bay also has lake access and includes 27 campsites. Both sites are accessed from Highway 167.

Fish Species 
The fish species include walleye, yellow perch, northern pike, lake trout, lake whitefish, cisco, white sucker, longnose sucker, and burbot.

See also 
List of lakes in Saskatchewan

References

External links 
Plan shewing mining locations on Amisk Lake 1914 (gold mining)

Lakes of Saskatchewan